The 1983 Guilin Airport collision was a ground collision between a People's Liberation Army Air Force (PLAAF) Harbin H-5 bomber and a CAAC (Guangzhou Division, now China Southern Airlines) Hawker-Siddeley Trident at the military – civilian Guilin Qifengling Airport, killing 11 passengers.

The accident
On 14 September 1983, a military aircraft collided into a CAAC (Guangzhou Division, now China Southern Airlines) Hawker-Siddeley Trident at the Guilin Qifengling Airport. The Trident was taxiing for take-off when it was struck by the Harbin H-5, ripping a large hole in the forward fuselage of the Trident. On board the Trident bound for Beijing were 100 passengers and 6 crew; of the 106 on board 11 passengers died and 21 were injured. The fate of the Harbin H-5 and its crew was not reported.

See also
Tenerife airport disaster, the most deadly runway collision

References

External links
 中国航空事故百年祭." CARNOC. 2012-10-09.

1983 disasters in China
Aviation accidents and incidents in 1983
Aviation accidents and incidents in China
Guilin
Accidents and incidents involving the Hawker Siddeley Trident
CAAC accidents and incidents
Accidents and incidents involving military aircraft
September 1983 events in Asia